The boliviano (sign: Bs ISO 4217 code: BOB) is the currency of Bolivia.  It is divided into 100 cents or centavos in Spanish. Boliviano was also the name of the currency of Bolivia between 1864 and 1963. From April 2018, the manager of the Central Bank of Bolivia, Pablo Ramos, announced the introduction of the new family of banknotes of the Plurinational State of Bolivia, started with the 10 Bs note, and then gradually arrived to introduce the 200 Bs note, presented in April 2019. The new family of banknotes of the Plurinational State received several awards such as "the best banknotes in Latin America", was highlighted by its security measures, its aesthetics and its inclusion of prominent figures in Bolivian history, being among those who awarded the "Latin American High Security Printing Press Conference".

History
Currencies in use before the current second boliviano include:
 The Spanish colonial real from the 16th to 19th centuries, with 8 reales equal to 1 peso and 16 reales equal to 1 escudo.
 The Bolivian sol from 1827 to 1864, replacing the Spanish real at par. 16 soles were equal to 1 Bolivian scudo, and 8 soles were equal to 1 boliviano.
 The first boliviano from 1864 to 1963, worth eight soles and divided into 100 centécimos (later centavos). The name bolivar was used for an amount of ten bolivianos.
 The peso boliviano (code ), from 1963 to 1986, worth 1,000 first bolivianos.

The second boliviano was introduced in 1987 at a rate of 1 boliviano = 1,000,000 pesos bolivianos.

Second boliviano
Following many years of rampant inflation, the bolivian peso was replaced in 1987 by a new boliviano at a rate of one million to one (when 1 US dollar was worth 1.8/1.9 million pesos). At that time, 1 new boliviano was roughly equivalent to  U.S. dollar.

Coins
In 1988, stainless-steel 2, 5, 10, 20 and 50 centavos and 1 boliviano (dated 1987) coins were introduced, followed by stainless-steel 2 bolivianos in 1991. Copper-plated steel 10 centavos were introduced in 1997 and bi-metallic 5 bolivianos in 2001. The 2 and 5 centavo coins are no longer in circulation. The 2 boliviano coin has been minted in two sizes, both of which remain legal tender. The smaller 2 boliviano coin is almost the same as the 1 boliviano coin, leading to potential confusion, although the 2 boliviano coins are undecagonal whilst the 1 boliviano coins are round.
All the coins in Bolivia have the value with the inscription "La union es la Fuerza" ("Union is strength" in Spanish) on the obverse. Older coins feature and the coat of arms of Bolivia with the inscription "Republica de Bolivia" (Republic of Bolivia) on the reverse, while newer ones feature the coat of arms with the inscription "Estado Plurinacional de Bolivia" (Plurinational state of Bolivia).

Banknotes

In 1987, last peso boliviano banknotes and cheques de gerência were overprinted with denominations in centavos and bolivianos to produce provisional issues of 1, 5, 10 and 50 centavos, and 1, 5 and 10 bolivianos. Regular issues followed the same year in denominations of 2, 5, 10, 20, 50, 100 and 200 bolivianos. The 2 boliviano note was replaced by a coin in 1991, with the same happening to the 5 boliviano in 2001, although the Bolivian central bank still lists the 5 boliviano note as "in circulation"
-The 10 Bolivianos bill has in the obverse to the painter Cecilio Guzman and reverse an image of city of Cochabamba. -The 20 Boliviano bill has in the obverse to the lawyer Pantaleon Dalence and in the reverse an image of The Golden Colonial House of Tarija. The 50 Boliviano bill has in the obverse to the painter Melchor Perez and in the reverse you can see the Tower of Church of the Society of Jesus in the city of Potosi- The 100 Boliviano bill has in the obverse of the great historian Gabriel Rene Moreno and the reverse one image of the Mayor Real and Papal University of Saint Francisco Xavier of Chuquisaca in the capital, the city of Sucre, the 200 Boliviano bill has to the obverse to the writer and former president of Bolivia, Franz Tamayo and in the reverse an image of ruins of the Pre-Inca empire of Tihuanaco in the shores of Lake Titicaca in the state or department of La Paz.

As of 2013. The 2 and 5 Bolivianos bills are officially out of circulation.

In 2018, the Central Bank of Bolivia (Banco Central de Bolivia) unveiled a new family of banknotes, and will be issued by order of denomination. The notes are the first to bear the formal name of Bolivia "Estado Plurinacional de Boliva" (Plurinational State of Bolivia), to reflect the multiculturalism of the country and all of its citizens.

Manufacture and production
As of 2013 the Boliviano is still manufactured abroad, in countries such as the United Kingdom, France, and Chile, even though Bolivia has been politically independent since 1825.

Though Bolivia was one of the main mints of the colonial era (casa de la moneda, Potosí) the coining and printing of currency stopped due to lack of political interest and on the idea that foreign made coins and banknotes could be acquired at a lower price than the Bolivian-made coins and banknotes.

US dollar-related currency (MVDOL) 
MVDOL (ISO 4217 code ) is a unit of currency (account). It has a value, inflation-adjusted between the Bolivian boliviano and the US dollar. It is used in financial instruments due to its stable value.

See also
 Economy of Bolivia
 Central Bank of Bolivia

References

External links

 Coins of Bolivia, online catalog with images 
 A gallery of the banknotes of Bolivia
Bolivian boliviano banknotes at Numista

Currencies of Bolivia
1864 introductions